Penu may refer to:
Penu, Estonia
Penu, Gilan, Iran
Penu, Golestan, Iran